The Barcelona Supercomputing Center is a public research center located in Barcelona, Catalonia, Spain. It hosts MareNostrum, a 13.7 Petaflops, Intel Xeon Platinum-based supercomputer, which also includes clusters of emerging technologies. , it ranked 13th in the world. , it dropped to 88th. It is expected to host one of Europe's first quantum computers.

Location and management
The Center is located in a former chapel named Torre Girona, at the Polytechnic University of Catalonia (UPC), and was established on April 1, 2005. It is managed by a consortium composed of the Spanish Ministry of Science and Innovation (60%), the Government of Catalonia (30%) and the UPC (10%). Professor Mateo Valero is its main administrator. The MareNostrum supercomputer is contained inside an enormous glass box in a former chapel.

Budget
The Barcelona Supercomputing Center had an initial operational budget of €5.5 million/year (about US$7 million/year) to cover the period of 2005–2011. The center has had a very rapid growth and in 2018 had a workforce of around 600 workers and an annual global budget of more than 34 million euros.

The Center has contributed to the development of the IBM cell microprocessor architecture.

Staff
Director: Mateo Valero
Associate director: Josep Maria Martorell
Computer Sciences director: Jesús Labarta
Computer Sciences associate director: Eduard Ayguadé
Life Sciences director: Alfonso Valencia
Earth Sciences director:
Computer Applications for Science and Engineering director: José María Cela
Operations director: Sergi Girona

In popular culture
The Barcelona Supercomputing Center appears in Dan Brown's 2017 science fiction mystery thriller novel Origin, as the home of the E-Wave device.

Notes

External links 
 Barcelona Supercomputing Center (BSC)

Research institutes in Catalonia
Polytechnic University of Catalonia
Supercomputer sites
2005 establishments in Catalonia
Research institutes established in 2005